is a village located in Saitama Prefecture, Japan. , the village had an estimated population of 2,701 in 1083 households and a population density of 65 persons per km2.

, the village had an estimated population of 2,903, and a population density of 78.3 persons per km2. The area has historically been associated with washi (traditional Japanese paper).

Geography
Higashichichibu is located in west-central Saitama Prefecture, in a valley isolated from the rest of the Chichibu plains by a range of low mountains.

Surrounding municipalities
Saitama Prefecture
 Chichibu
 Minano
 Yorii
 Ogawa
 Tokigawa

Climate
Higashichichibu has a Humid continental climate (Köppen Cfa) characterized by warm summers and cool winters with light  snowfall.  The average annual temperature in Higashichichibu is 13.0 °C. The average annual rainfall is 1746 mm with September as the wettest month. The temperatures are highest on average in August, at around 21.9 °C, and lowest in January, at around minus 1.2 °C.

Demographics
Per Japanese census data, the population of Higashichichibu has declined steadily over the past 70 years.

History
The villages of Okawara and Tsukikawa were created within Chichibu District, Saitama with the establishment of the modern municipalities system on April 1, 1889. The two villages merged to form Higashichichibu on August 1, 1956.

Government
Higashichichibu has a mayor-council form of government with a directly elected mayor and a unicameral village council of eight members. Higashichichibu, together with the towns of Ogano, Minano, Nagatoro and Yokoze, contributes one member to the Saitama Prefectural Assembly. In terms of national politics, the village is part of Saitama 11th district of the lower house of the Diet of Japan.

Economy
The economy of Higashichichibu is primarily agricultural with some light manufacturing. It is increasingly a bedroom community due to its proximity to the town of Ogawa.

Education
Higashichichibu has one public elementary schools and one public middle school operated by the town government. The village does not have a high school.

Transportation

Railway
Higashichichibu has no passenger rail service. The nearest station is Yorii Station, in the neighboring town of Yorii or Ogawamachi Station in the town of Ogawa.

Highway
Higashichichibu is not served by any of the Japanese national highways.

Sister city relation
 – Ambert, Auvergne, France, since October 23, 1989
 – Sterling, Colorado, USA, since March 17, 1997

Local attractions
 Chichibu Washi no sato

References

External links

Official website 

Villages in Saitama Prefecture
Chichibu District, Saitama
Higashichichibu, Saitama